Luossavaara-Kiirunavaara Aktiebolag (LKAB) is a government owned Swedish mining company. The company mines iron ore at Kiruna and at Malmberget in northern Sweden. The company was established in 1890, and has been 100% state-owned since the 1950s. The iron ore is processed to pellets and sinter fines, which are transported by Iore trains (Malmbanan) to the harbours at Narvik and Luleå and to the steelmill at Luleå (SSAB). Their production is sold throughout much of the world, with the principal markets being European steel mills, as well as North Africa, the Middle East and Southeast Asia.

, LKAB has over 4,500 employees in 12 countries. There are iron ore mines, processing plants and ore harbors in northern Sweden and Norway, and a sales office in Germany. LKAB has subsidiaries for industrial minerals with processing plants in Sweden, Finland, the UK, the Netherlands, Turkey and China. Additional subsidiaries are in Germany, the US and Hong Kong as well as representative offices in Slovakia, Greece, Spain and South Africa.

LKAB's chief assets are among the magnetite orefields of northern Sweden. Its corporate headquarters are in Luleå and the main production sites are in Kiruna (Kiruna Mine) and Malmberget, close to Gällivare.  The ore is partially processed on site, and is transported by freight train on Malmbanan to either Narvik or Luleå depending on final destination. LKAB has been ranked as among the 14th best of 92 oil, gas, and mining companies on indigenous rights and resource extraction in the Arctic. In 2021, LKAB was ranked no. 23 out of 120 oil, gas, and mining companies involved in resource extraction north of the Arctic Circle in the Arctic Environmental Responsibility Index (AERI).

Timeline
 1890 LKAB is founded.
 1891 AB Gellivare Malmfält founded.
 1893 AB Gellivare Malmfält bought LKAB.
 1899 Ore line from the south reaches Kiruna.
 1957 The government takes over LKAB to 96%. Traffic Grangesberg-Oxelosund (TGO) retains 4%.
 1976 LKAB becomes a government-owned corporation.

Sponsorships
LKAB sponsors Swedish cross-country skiers Marcus Hellner and Charlotte Kalla.

See also
Swedish iron ore during World War II

References

External links

Iron ore mining companies
Mining companies of Sweden
Kiruna
Companies based in Norrbotten County
Non-renewable resource companies established in 1890
Ironworks in Sweden
Metal companies of Sweden
Electric power distribution network operators in Sweden
Swedish companies established in 1890